Shomronella jordanica is the only species in the extinct genus Shomronella, a genus of prehistoric frogs. According to findings from fossils of S. jordanica, that were found in Jordan and Israel, the frog lived during the Lower Cretaceous, specifically in the Hauterivian to Barremian.

See also
 Pipimorpha
 List of prehistoric amphibians

References

Prehistoric frogs
Early Cretaceous frogs
Early Cretaceous amphibians of Asia
Fossil taxa described in 1978
Pipoidea